Napoleon's Barber is a 1928 American featurette drama film directed by John Ford, and filmed in the Fox Movietone sound-on-film system. The film, Ford's first talkie, is now considered to be a lost film.

Cast
 Otto Matieson as Napoleon
 Natalie Golitzen as Empress Josephine
 Frank Reicher as Napoleon's Barber
 Helen Ware as The Barber's Wife
 Philippe De Lacy as The Barber's Son
 D'Arcy Corrigan as Tailor
 Russ Powell as Blacksmith
 Michael Mark as Peasant
 Buddy Roosevelt as French Officer
 Ervin Renard as French Officer
 Youcca Troubetzkoy as French Officer
 Joseph Waddell as French Officer
 Henry Hebert as Soldier

See also
List of lost films

References

External links

1928 films
American black-and-white films
1928 drama films
1928 short films
Films directed by John Ford
Lost American films
1928 lost films
Lost drama films
1920s English-language films
1920s American films